This article explains the phonology of Malay and Indonesian based on the pronunciation of Standard Malay, which is the official language of Brunei, Singapore and Malaysia, and Indonesian, which is the official language of Indonesia and a working language in Timor Leste. 'standard' in Malay/Indonesian), used in Indonesia and Singapore.

Consonants
The consonants of Standard Malay (Malaysian and Bruneian) and also Indonesian are shown below. Non-native consonants that only occur in borrowed words, principally from Arabic and English, are shown in parentheses. Some analyses list 19 "primary consonants" for Malay as the 18 symbols that are not in parentheses in the table as well as the glottal stop .

Orthographic note:
The sounds are represented orthographically by their symbols as above, except:

  is written  before a vowel,  before  and 
  is written 
 the glottal stop  is written as a final  or an apostrophe 
  is written 
  is written 
  is written 
  is written 
  is written 
  is written  or 
  is written  and transcribed into .
  is written  and transcribed into .

Notes
In syllable codas, they are usually unreleased, with final  generally being realised as a glottal stop in native words. There is no liaison, that is, no audible release even when followed by a vowel in another word, as in kulit ubi ('tapioca skins') , though they are pronounced as a normal medial consonant when followed by a suffix.
// is dental [] in many varieties of Malay and in Indonesian.
 The glottal stop  may be represented by an apostrophe in Arabic derived words such as Al Qur'an. In some words like terulang "being repeated" /ˈtərʔulaŋ/ that are derived from vowel-initial words with a prefix, the glottal stop is not reflected in writing.
  is pronounced clearly between like vowels, as in Pahang. Elsewhere it is a very light sound, and is frequently silent, as in  ~  ('forest'),  ~  ('answer'),  ~  ('beautiful'). The exception to this tendency is initial  from Arabic loans such as hakim ('judge').
  varies significantly across dialects. The trill  is sometimes reduced to a single vibration when single, making it phonetically a flap , so that the pronunciation of a single  varies between trill , flap  and, in some instances, postalveolar approximant [ɹ̠]. The final  is silent in Johor-Riau (Piawai) Pronunciation, while audible as /r/ in Northern Peninsular Pronunciation and Baku Pronunciation.
 Voiced stops do not occur in final position in native words. Some pronunciation guides consider this devoicing nonstandard and prescribe to pronounce final b and d as written, i.e. voiced.
Arabic and English) and are aware of the original pronunciations of the words.

Loans from Arabic:
 Phonemes which occur only in Arabic loans may be pronounced distinctly by speakers who know Arabic, otherwise they tend to be substituted with native sounds.

Nasal assimilation
Important in the derivation of Malay verbs and nouns is the assimilation of the nasal consonant at the end of the derivational prefixes meng- , a verbal prefix, and peng- , a nominal prefix.

The nasal segment is dropped before sonorant consonants (nasals , liquids , and approximants ).

This phoneme loss rule was mnemonically named  "KPST rule" in Indonesian.

Vowels
It is usually said that there are six vowels in Standard Malay (Malaysian and Brunei) and Indonesian. These six vowels are shown in the table below.

Notes
There are also some Malay varieties where the open final /a/ is pronounced as neither such as Kelantan-Pattani Malay where it is pronounced as an open back unrounded [] instead.
 Word-final [e] and [o] are rare in Malay, except for loanwords, like teko (teapot, from Hokkien  tê-kó͘), toko (small shop, from Hokkien   thó͘-khò͘), semberono (careless, from Javanese sembrono), gede (Javanese of big), konde (from Javanese kondhe, bulbous hairdo or hair extension on the back of the head), kare (Indonesian term for curry, variation of kari, from Tamil kai), mestizo (from Spanish), kredo (creed, from Latin credo), resiko (risk, from Dutch risico), and non-Malay Indonesian names, like Manado and Suharto.
Words borrowed earlier have a more nativized pronunciation, such as pesta ('fest'), which is pronounced . Some systems represent  as ⟨ó⟩.

Example: qari .

 There is also a [ɪ] in Indonesian, but is an allophone of [i] as the second vowel in a hiatus such as air ('water') [a.ɪr], but see below.
 The vowels of [], [], and [] are commonly written without diacritics as ⟨e⟩. The diacritics are only used to indicate the correct pronunciation, for example, in dictionaries. In Indonesian, the vowels are marked with diacrtics as [] ⟨é⟩, [] ⟨è⟩ and [] ⟨ê⟩. A different system represents [], [], and [] as ⟨e⟩, ⟨é⟩, and ⟨ě⟩ respectively.

Diphthongs
Some analyses claim that Malay has three native diphthong phonemes only in open syllables; they are:
 : kedai ('shop'), pandai ('clever')
 : kerbau ('buffalo')
 : dodoi, amboi

Others assume that these "diphthongs" are actually a monophthong followed by an approximant, so  represents ,  represents , and  represents  . On this basis, there are no phonological diphthongs in Malay.

However, Indonesian introduced forth diphthong of  since 2015, such as in ⟨Méi⟩ ('May') /mei̯/.

Diphthongs are differentiated from two vowels in two syllables, such as:
 : e.g. rai ('celebrate') , air ('water')  ~ 
 : bau ('smell') , laut ('sea')  ~ 

Even if it is not differentiated in modern Latin spelling, diphthongs and two vowels are differentiated in the spelling in Jawi, where a vowel hiatus is indicated by the symbol hamzah , for example: لاوت laut ('sea').

Stress
Malay has light stress that falls on either the final or penultimate syllable, depending on regional variations as well as the presence of the schwa in a word. It is generally the penultimate syllable that is stressed, unless its vowel is a schwa . If the penult has a schwa, then stress moves to the ante-penultimate syllable if there is one, even if that syllable has a schwa as well; if the word is disyllabic, the stress is final. In disyllabic words with a closed penultimate syllable, such as tinggal ('stay') and rantai ('chain'), stress falls on the penult.

However, there is some disagreement among linguists over whether stress is phonemic (unpredictable), with some analyses suggesting that there is no underlying stress in Malay.

Rhythm
The classification of languages based on rhythm can be problematic. Nevertheless, acoustic measurements suggest that Malay has more syllable-based rhythm than British English, even though doubts remain about whether the syllable is the appropriate unit for the study of Malay prosody.

Syllable structure
Most of the native lexicon is based on disyllabic root morphemes, with a small percentage of monosyllabic and trisyllabic roots.  However, with the widespread occurrence of prefixes and suffixes, many words of five or more syllables are found.

(See the discussion of diphthongs above.)

Baku pronunciation in Malaysia and Singapore
The  standard started being implemented in Malaysia in 1988 but this ceased in 2000. The Malaysian Minister of Education had been quoted saying that the  standard "is different from the pronunciation commonly used by the people of this country". Singapore started using the  standard for official purposes in 1990. Ever since then, there have been various protests from Malay Singaporeans, calling for the return of the Johor-Riau standard as the official standard for Malay pronunciation. One prominent critic of the use of the  standard is Berita Harian editor, Guntor Sadali, who noted that "members of the Malay community generally find that  ( Pronunciation) is very awkward".

References

Bibliography

Malay language
Austronesian phonologies